Jay Stansfield (born 24 November 2002) is an English professional footballer who plays as a forward for Exeter City, on loan from  club Fulham.

Career
Son of former Yeovil Town, Hereford United and Exeter City footballer Adam Stansfield, he began his footballing career in the academy of Exeter City. In August 2019, Stansfield signed for Championship side Fulham for an undisclosed fee. On 4 January 2020, Stansfield made his debut for Fulham in an FA Cup third round match against Aston Villa, coming on in the 82nd minute for Josh Onomah. Later that month, he made his league debut as an 88th-minute substitute in Fulham's EFL Championship match away at Charlton Athletic, again replacing Josh Onomah. He scored his first goal for the club in the 26th minute of Fulham's EFL Cup tie against Birmingham City on 24 August 2021.

On 2 September 2022, Stansfield returned to his boyhood club, Exeter City on a season-long loan. Stansfield made his Exeter debut on 3 September as a 79th minute substitute in a 1–0 victory over MK Dons. He wore the no. 9 shirt, following in the footsteps of his late-father, Adam Stansfield, who died of cancer in 2010. A run of four goals and two assists saw Stansfield win the EFL Young Player of the Month award for October 2022.

International career
Having represented England at under-18 level, Stansfield made his under-20 debut on 7 October 2021 during a 1–1 draw with Italy at Technique Stadium in Chesterfield.

Career statistics

Honours
Individual
EFL Young Player of the Month: October 2022

References

External links
Jay Stansfield profile at the Fulham F.C. website

2002 births
Living people
English footballers
England youth international footballers
Association football forwards
Exeter City F.C. players
Fulham F.C. players
English Football League players
Premier League players